Mike Gomez (born April 18, 1951) is an American actor. Best known for his performances in such cult classics as The Big Lebowski and Star Trek: The Next Generation, Gomez has costarred in numerous films including Heartbreak Ridge and Milagro Beanfield War, Zoot Suit, The Border and El Norte, to name a few. His TV credits include Bones, The Shield, Desperate Housewives, and a series regular role as 'Capt. Gallardo' on the NBC series, Hunter, among others. On stage, Gomez' numerous theater credits include Zoot Suit at the Winter Garden on Broadway and the Pre-Broadway run of Selena.

Partial filmography 

 How the West Was Won
 Episode: "The Slavers" (1979) .... Brother Carlos
 Getting Wasted (1980) .... Hector
 Zoot Suit (1981) .... Joey / Jose Torres
 The Border (1982) .... Manuel
 also as dialogue coach: Spanish
 El Norte (1983) .... Jaime
 Women of San Quentin (1983, TV Movie) .... Mexican Gang Member
 T.J. Hooker
 Episode: "Lady in Blue" (1983) .... Dino Morales
 Episode: "Deadlock" (1984) .... Gomez
 The Yellow Rose .... Sanchez
 Episode: "Divided We Fall" (1983)
 Episode: "When Honor Dies" (1983)
 Episode: "Walls of Fear" (1983)
 Episode: "Sins of the Father" (1983)
 Hill Street Blues
 Episode: "Ratman and Bobbin" (1984) .... Pimp
 Episode: "Nichols from Heaven" (1984) .... Pimp
 Episode: "Fuchs Me? Fuchs You!" (1984) .... Jose
 Appointment with Fear (1985) .... Little Joe
 The Patriot (1986) .... Kenwood
 Heartbreak Ridge (1986) .... Quinones
 Werewolf (1988)
 Episode: "Nightmare in Blue" .... Officer Lopez
 The Milagro Beanfield War (1988) .... Milagro Townsperson
 21 Jump Street
 Episode: "La Bizca" (1990) .... Paco
 By Dawn's Early Light (1990, TV Movie) .... E-4 Co-Pilot
 Star Trek: The Next Generation
 Episode: "The Last Outpost" (1987) .... DaiMon Tarr
 Episode: "Rascals" (1992) .... DaiMon Lurin
 The X Files
 Episode: "Little Green Men" (1994) .... Jorge Concepcion
 Courthouse
 Episode: "Child Support" (1995) .... Martin Rivera
 Chicago Hope
 Episode: "White Trash" (1997) .... Det. Dennis Jimenez
 The Big Lebowski (1998) .... Auto Circus Cop (as Michael Gomez)
 Dance with Me (1998) .... Bartender
 Running Woman (1998) .... Lupo
 Walker, Texas Ranger
 Episode: "Jacob's Ladder" (1999) .... Joe Salizar
 Luminarias (1999) .... Frank Chavez
 Metal (1999) .... Party Goer (as Michael Gomez)
 Short Changed (2000) .... Guadalupe
 Under Suspicion (2000) .... Singer (voice)
 Resurrection Blvd.
 Episode: "Juntos (Together)" (2001)
 Road Dogz (2002) .... Antonio Carrasco
 Hunter: Return to Justice (2002, TV Movie)
 Hunter: Back in Force (2003, TV Movie) .... Captain Gallardo
 Hunter (2003, TV Series) .... Capt. Roberto Gallardo
 Forgotten Voices (2004, Short) .... Don Sebastian
 Locusts (2005, TV Movie) .... Secretary Morales
 3some (2005, Short) .... Carlos
 Desperate Housewives
 Episode: "There's Something About a War" (2006) .... Second Priest
 Bones
 Episode: "The Woman in the Garden" (2006) .... Hector Alvaredo
 Yes Man (2008) .... Father at Homeless Shelter
 Criminal Minds
 Episode: "Foundation..." (2012) .... Detective Nate Perez
 Devious Maids
 Episode: "pilot" (2013) .... Priest
 The Caretaker (2016) .... Gilberto
 The Aliens (2017) .... Sheriff

References

External links
 MikeGomez.us(Official Website)
 

1951 births
American male stage actors
American male film actors
American male television actors
Living people
People from Dallas